Kael Mouillierat (born December 9, 1987) is a Canadian professional ice hockey forward. He is currently playing under contract to the Krefeld Pinguine of the DEL2.

Playing career
Prior to turning professional, Mouillierat attended Minnesota State University, Mankato where he played four seasons in NCAA Division I with the Minnesota State Mavericks men's ice hockey team. On December 16, 2011, the Bridgeport Sound Tigers of the American Hockey League (AHL) signed him to a professional tryout agreement.

After recording a career high 42 points in 50 games with the St. John's IceCaps in the 2012–13 season, Mouillierat re-signed for a second season with the IceCaps, agreeing to a one-year deal on June 14, 2013. Mouillierat continued his steady upward development in the 2013–14 season again totalling career highs with 20 goals and 53 points in only 60 games with the IceCaps. In leading the IceCaps to the Calder Cup finals for the first time in franchise history, Mouillierat gained considerable interest and signed his first NHL contract on a one-year two-way deal with the New York Islanders of the National Hockey League (NHL) on July 1, 2014.

Mouillierat was assigned to the Islanders' AHL affiliate, the Sound Tigers. He spent the majority of the season there before being called up to the Islanders on February 20, 2015, after an injury to Mikhail Grabovski. He recorded his first NHL point (an assist) followed by his first NHL goal on February 24, 2015 against Mike Smith of the Arizona Coyotes.

On July 1, 2015, Mouillierat left the Islanders as a free agent after one season and signed a one-year, two-way contract with the Pittsburgh Penguins.

After spending the entirety of his professional career in North America, on July 21, 2016, Mouillierat opted to pursue an opportunity abroad, agreeing to a one-year contract with Swedish club, Luleå HF of the top-tier Swedish Hockey League. In the 2016–17 season, Mouillierat struggled to find his offensive touch in the Swedish league, compiling just 4 goals and 14 points in 47 games.

At the conclusion of the season, Mouillierat left as a free agent to sign a one-year contract with German club, ERC Ingolstadt of the DEL, on July 17, 2017. After a productive 2017–18 season with Ingolstadt, having posted 31 points in 50 games, Mouillierat opted to continue in the DEL signing a one-year deal with rivals, the Straubing Tigers on April 12, 2018.

Following four seasons with the Straubing Tigers, Mouillierat left the club as a free agent and agreed to join newly relegated Krefeld Pinguine of the DEL2, on May 3, 2022.

Career statistics

Awards and honours

References

External links
 

1987 births
Living people
Bridgeport Sound Tigers players
Canadian ice hockey left wingers
Drayton Valley Thunder players
Idaho Steelheads (ECHL) players
ERC Ingolstadt players
Luleå HF players
Minnesota State Mavericks men's ice hockey players
New York Islanders players
Pittsburgh Penguins players
St. John's IceCaps players
Ice hockey people from Edmonton
Straubing Tigers players
Texas Stars players
Undrafted National Hockey League players
Wilkes-Barre/Scranton Penguins players
Canadian expatriate ice hockey players in Germany
Canadian expatriate ice hockey players in Sweden
Minnesota State University, Mankato alumni